The 1953 LPGA Tour was the fourth season since the LPGA Tour officially began in 1950. The season ran from January 15 to October 18. The season consisted of 25 official money events. Louise Suggs won the most tournaments, nine. She also led the money list with earnings of $19,816.

This season also saw the introduction of the Vare Trophy for the lowest scoring average, won by Patty Berg. There was only one first-time winner in 1953, Jackie Pung.

The tournament results and award winners are listed below.

Tournament results
The following table shows all the official money events for the 1953 season. "Date" is the ending date of the tournament. The numbers in parentheses after the winners' names are the number of wins they had on the tour up to and including that event. Majors are shown in bold.

Awards

References

External links
LPGA Tour official site

LPGA Tour seasons
LPGA Tour